O Horizon is an upcoming sci-fi comedy drama film written and directed by Madeleine Sackler. It stars Maria Bakalova as Abby, a gifted neuroscientist who uses her career to bury the grief over her recently deceased father, David Strathairn as her late father Warren, and Adam Pally as Sam, a computer programmer who helps Abby reconnect her with her father.

Plot
Abby, a brilliant, young neuroscientist who has recently lost her father, Warren, and drowns her grief by spending her days working with a monkey named Dorey. Abby meets a programmer, Sam, who has created a technology that reconnects Abby with her beloved father. Her relationship with her digitized dad then forces her to re-examine everything from her romantic relationships to her life's work.

Cast
 Maria Bakalova as Abby
 David Strathairn as Warren
 Adam Pally as Sam

Production
In January 2023, it was announced that Madeleine Sackler would be directing O Horizon from a script she wrote, with Maria Bakalova and David Strathairn leading the cast. Later that month, it was announced that Adam Pally would also star in the film. Production wrapped in the fall of 2022.

In January 2023, Artnet reported that the film's storyline sparked objections with some of its crew, who felt uncomfortable with how closely it resembled Sackler's relationship with her own father, Jonathan Sackler, who died of cancer in 2020, and how it portrayed him in a good light. She was previously also criticized for not denouncing her family's company Purdue Pharma, infamous for its role in the opioid epidemic. One crew member allegedly quit work on the production. Sackler denied the allegations.

References

External links
 

American robot films
American science fiction comedy-drama films
Android (robot) films
Fictional artificial intelligences
Films about artificial intelligence
Films shot in New York City
Upcoming English-language films
Upcoming films